Anthony Ian Christopher Dodemaide  (born 5 October 1963) is an Australian former test cricketer. After a three-year stint as Chief Executive of the Western Australian Cricket Association in Perth, he became the current chief executive of Cricket Victoria. He is currently a selector for the Australian men's national team.
 
He took 534 first-class wickets for Victoria and Sussex. He also took a five-wicket haul on both his Test and One Day International (ODI) debuts.

International career
Dodemaide began his career as a fast-bowling all-rounder and competed in 10 Tests and 24 One Day Internationals for Australia. Despite healthy batting and bowling averages for an all-rounder at test level (23 and 28 respectively), Dodemaide only made ten Test appearances. On his debut, he took six wickets in the second innings against New Zealand in Melbourne in 1987.

On his debut ODI against Sri Lanka, he took 5 wickets.

After retirement
He joined the WACA in May 2004 after five years as the Head of Cricket for the Marylebone Cricket Club. Prior to the MCC position, he was Manager of Corporate Marketing at the Melbourne Cricket Club. In October 2021, he joined the Cricket Australia panel of selectors.

In the 2022 Australia Day Honours, he was awarded the Medal of the Order of Australia for "service to sports administration, and to cricket".

References

External links

1963 births
Living people
Recipients of the Medal of the Order of Australia
Australia One Day International cricketers
Australia Test cricketers
Sussex cricketers
Victoria cricketers
People from Williamstown, Victoria
Australian chief executives
Cricketers who have taken five wickets on Test debut
Australian cricketers
Cricketers who have taken five wickets on One Day International debut
Australian cricket administrators
Cricketers from Melbourne
Marylebone Cricket Club cricketers
Australia national cricket team selectors